The 1969–70 Cupa României was the 32nd edition of Romania's most prestigious football cup competition.

The title was won by Steaua București against Dinamo București.

Format
The competition is an annual knockout tournament.

In the first round proper, two pots were made, first pot with Divizia A teams and other teams till 16 and the second pot with the rest of teams qualified in this phase. Each tie is played as a single leg.

First round proper matches are played on the ground of the lowest ranked team, then from the second round proper the matches are played on a neutral location.

In the first round proper, if a match is drawn after 90 minutes, the game goes in extra time, and if the scored is still tight after 120 minutes, the team who played away will qualify.

From the second round proper, if a match is drawn after 90 minutes, the game goes in extra time, and if the scored is still tight after 120 minutes, then the team from the lower division will qualify. If the teams are from the same division a replay will be played.

From the first edition, the teams from Divizia A entered in competition in sixteen finals, rule which remained till today.

Bracket

First round proper

|colspan=3 style="background-color:#FFCCCC;"|16 May 1970

|-
|colspan=3 style="background-color:#FFCCCC;"|17 May 1970

|-
|colspan=3 style="background-color:#FFCCCC;"|24 May 1970

|-
|colspan=3 style="background-color:#FFCCCC;"|25 May 1970

|-
|colspan=3 style="background-color:#FFCCCC;"|27 May 1970

|}

Second round proper

|colspan=3 style="background-color:#FFCCCC;"|30 May 1970

|-
|colspan=3 style="background-color:#FFCCCC;"|31 May 1970

|}

Quarter-finals 

|colspan=3 style="background-color:#FFCCCC;"|13 June 1970

|-
|colspan=3 style="background-color:#FFCCCC;"|17 June 1970

|-
|colspan=3 style="background-color:#FFCCCC;"|18 June 1970

|-
|colspan=3 style="background-color:#FFCCCC;"|20 June 1970

|}
Notes:
 Because the lack of time in the competition format, no replay were played, Argeș Pitești won after coin toss and qualified in the Semi-finals.

Semi-finals

|colspan=3 style="background-color:#FFCCCC;"|24 June 1970

|}

Final

References

External links
 romaniansoccer.ro
 Official site
 The Romanian Cup on the FRF's official site

Cupa României seasons
Cupa Romaniei
Romania